Serena Williams defeated Martina Hingis in the final, 6–3, 7–6(7–4) to win the women's singles tennis title at the 1999 US Open. It was her first major singles title, the first of an eventual Open Era joint-record six US Open titles, and the first of an eventual Open Era record 23 major singles titles. Williams became the first African American woman in the Open Era to win a singles major.

Lindsay Davenport was the defending champion, but lost to Williams in the semifinals.

Seeds

Qualifying

Draw

Finals

Top half

Section 1

Section 2

Section 3

Section 4

Bottom half

Section 5

Section 6

Section 7

Section 8

Qualifying draw

External links
1999 US Open – Women's draws and results at the International Tennis Federation

Women's Singles
US Open (tennis) by year – Women's singles
1999 in women's tennis
1999 in American women's sports